MKS Kluczbork is a football club based in Kluczbork, Opole Voivodeship, Poland.

History
The club was founded in 2003 as the merger of three local clubs: KKS Kluczbork (itself a result of merger in 1945 between ZKK Kluczbork and Cresovia Kluczbork), LKS Kuniów and the local inter-school sports organisation. The club itself, although founded recently, relates to the town's very rich footballing history, inheriting the stadium and facilities of the previous most successful Kluczbork club Metal Kluczbork.

In season 2008–09 the club won the Western Division of the Second League, and were consequently promoted to the First League for the 2009–10 season.

They reached the 1/8th of the Polish Cup in the 2011-12 season, losing eventually 1–0 to Ruch Zdzieszowice

Honours & Achievements
 1/8 Polish Cup: 2011-12

Current squad

References

External links
 MKS Kluczbork Official Website

 
Football clubs in Poland
Kluczbork County
Association football clubs established in 2003
2003 establishments in Poland